The Moba people, or Bimoba, are a Gur-speaking ethnic group from north-eastern Ghana and north-western Togo. Population centres in Ghana include Bimbagu and Bunkpurugu.  The Bimoba number approximately 250,000 people in north-eastern Ghana and about 320,000 people in northern Togo.

Origin
The Bimoba are believed to have migrated southwards from the Present-day Burkina-Faso following the collapse of the Kingdom of Fada-Gurma around 1420.

Society
Bimoba society is patriarchal and is structured around clan and family heads. There are Clan-based kings or chiefs with vested power to hold the various clans together. The clans themselves can be located on multiple locations based on power and numbers. Presently, the clan groups of the Bimoba include Luok, Gnadaung, Dikperu, Puri, Tanmung, Gbong, Labsiak, Kunduek, Buok, the Baakpang, Turinwe and Kanyakib.

Religion
The Bimoba practice predominantly ethnic religions. They identify with personal deities collectively referred to as Yennu, which translates as "god" or "sun". Their ancestors play a role by being the contact between themselves and Yannu. A typical Bimoba compound would have a clay construction altar (patir; plural: pataa) in an enclosed hut (nakouk) where sacrifices are made to invoke the presence of the ancestors. Women are allowed into the nakuuk. Aside the patir located in the compound, every family member is allowed to construct their own small altar known as a mier. Communities may have a common shrine known as tingban. The tingban is visited at times of problems that concern the entire community such as a drought or a disease outbreak.

Notable people
 Solomon Namliit Boar

References

Ethnic groups in Ghana
Dagbon